SS Willis L. King (Official number 208397) was a , steel-hulled, propeller-driven American Great Lakes freighter built in 1911 by the Great Lakes Engineering Works of Ecorse, Michigan. She was scrapped in 1984 in Ashtabula, Ohio. Willis L. King is best known for her collision with the steamer  on August 20, 1920, in Whitefish Bay.

History
The large fleet was managed by W.H. Becker, a prominent fleet manager and owner from Cleveland, Ohio.

Willis L. Kings keel was laid on September 12, 1910; slightly over three months later she was launched on December 17, 1911 as hull number #79. She was commissioned by the Interstate Steamship Company (W.H. Becker, Mgr.) of Cleveland, Ohio (a subsidiary of Jones and Laughlin Steel Company). She entered service on April 18, 1911, sailing light from Ecorse, Michigan, bound for Toledo, Ohio.

Superior City disaster
On August 20, 1920 Willis L. King had just unloaded a cargo of iron ore at Ashtabula, Ohio, and was on her way to the ore docks to pick up another load of ore. Meanwhile,  was downbound from Two Harbors, Minnesota, heavily loaded with 7,600 tons of iron ore in her cargo hold.

Noted Great Lakes maritime historian and author Dwight Boyer described the collision between the two ships in his book Ships and Men of the Great Lakes. He wrote:    

"She was [R]ammed on her port side, aft of midships … [causing] … a tremendous explosion when the terrible inrushing wall of cold water burst her aft bulkheads and hit the boilers.  The vessel’s stern was literally blown off…. [and she] was nearly halved in the collision."

Most of Superior Citys crew were trying to lower the lifeboats that were located directly above the boilers. When the cold water caused the boilers to explode, the majority of the crew was killed instantly. The deadly collision occurred at 9:10 pm.

Later history
On May 31, 1926, Willis L. King collided with the  laker  in heavy fog just twelve miles above the Soo Locks.

References

1911 ships
Great Lakes freighters
Ships built in Ecorse, Michigan
Maritime incidents in 1920
Merchant ships of the United States
Steamships of the United States
Ships powered by a triple expansion steam engine
Maritime incidents in 1926